Charles Donovan Kelley (born March 7, 1947), better known by his ring name Chick Donovan, is an American semi-retired professional wrestler who worked for Georgia Championship Wrestling and a short time with World Championship Wrestling.

Professional wrestling career
Making his professional debut in 1977, he carried on notable feuds with wrestling legends Jerry "The King" Lawler and Tommy Rich. He wrestled at the peak of his career in the American Wrestling Association and the NWA.

In 1981, while working for the Continental Wrestling Association in Memphis, he was recruited into The First Family by manager (& then-AWA Southern Heavyweight Champion) Jimmy Hart. Donovan would later win the Southern Heavyweight title from Hart in a farcical match when Hart laid down in the ring and allowed Donovan to pin him. Donovan would be stripped of the belt because of the way in which he won it not long after.

From 1987 to 1988 he wrestled in World Wrestling Federation as a jobber losing to Ricky Steamboat and The Ultimate Warrior.

From 1992 until 1995 he wrestled for World Championship Wrestling as a jobber. On June 20, 1995 he faced against WCW US Champion Sting in a losing effort on WCW Pro.

In 1995 he returned to WWF jobbing by making a couple appearances on TV. He retired later that year.

In 2005, Donovan came out of retirement.

His last official match was on February 3, 2006 in Birmingham, AL against Adrian Street.

On August 11, 2007, Donovan made a return to in-ring action with Georgia Wrestling Promotions, appearing at a show in Waleska, Georgia, pinning Chris Lightning. He is currently wrestling for the Prime Time Pro Wrestling (PTPW) and IWN (Independent Wrestling Network), both based in the Columbus area. Donovan, also makes frequent appearances at the Allstar Wrestling Network (AWN) in Fort Valley, Georgia.

Tommy Rich & Scotty Blaze & Hawkins beat Chick Donovan & Billy Love & Valentine in Villa Rica Georgia in Nov. 2007.

Chick Donovan wrestled for Alabama Wrestling federation on April 24, 2010 in Lucedale, Ms.

Chick Donovan has made several appearances for Swainsboro, Georgia-based company, Galaxie Pro Xtreme Wrestling, holding the GPXW World Heavyweight Championship. He battled Scotty Bullwinkle in November, losing via countout, and December, going to a double countout at shows in 2010.

Throughout 2010 Donovan has also frequently appeared at Fort Valley's AWN where he has feuded with Jake Slater, Paul Warfield, Joey Kidman, Chris Nelms and other up and comers. In addition to the AWN Donovan made his debut in Championship Wrestling Overload, as well as appearing in many other promotions.

On July 7, 2018, Donovan lost to the Masked Professional in a hair vs mask match at a CCW event in Dothan, Alabama. After the match the Masked Professional cut off all of Donovan's long blonde hair.

At 73, Donovan won the DHCW Heavyweight Championship for Down Home Championship Wrestling in LaGrange, Georgia, where he defeated Oxford Haney.

Championships and accomplishments
All-Star Wrestling Network
AWN World Heavyweight Championship (1 time)
AWN Tag Team Championship (1 time) – with Paul Warfield
Continental Wrestling Association
AWA International Heavyweight Championship (1 time)
AWA Southern Heavyweight Championship (1 time)
AWA Southern Tag Team Championship (1 time) – with Jack Hart
Galaxie Pro Xtreme Wrestling
GPXW World Heavyweight Championship (1 time)
Independent International Wrestling Association
IIWA Tag Team Championship (1 time) – with Tim Horner
Main Event Wrestling
MEW Georgia Heavyweight Championship (1 time)
Southeastern Championship Wrestling
NWA United States Junior Heavyweight Championship (2 times)

References

External links
Profile at Online World of Wrestling

American male professional wrestlers
1947 births
Living people
People from LaGrange, Georgia
Professional wrestlers from Georgia (U.S. state)
The First Family (professional wrestling) members
20th-century professional wrestlers
21st-century professional wrestlers
AWA International Heavyweight Champions